Bart Goor (born 9 April 1973) is a Belgian former professional footballer who played as a left winger.

Club career

Geel
Goor began his professional career representing K.F.C. Verbroedering Geel in 1991 having risen through the club's youth ranks. He spent six years at the Antwerp-based club, playing 142 league games for and scoring 27 goals for the club playing from a midfield position.

Racing Genk
Eventually, Goor caught the eye of Racing Genk and transferred there for the 1996–97 season. His first and only season at the club proved very successful, especially in goal return, the midfielder successfully netting with an average for the club of just over a goal every two games.

Anderlecht
His season at Genk obviously caught the eye of the R.S.C. Anderlecht hierarchy and Goor joined the Belgian giants, making his debut for his new side on 12 August 1997, in an eventual 2–0 victory over Ukrainian side Vorskla Poltava. A month later, on 16 September, Goor netted his first Anderlecht goal, scoring the second goal for R.S.C. in a 4–3 win over SV Austria Salzburg. In this first term with Anderlecht, Goor completed 32 Belgian First Division games, scoring 8 goals – a downturn from his tally the previous year at Genk but an impressive feat nonetheless for a midfielder.

Following this first season, Goor would go on to represent Anderlecht in all competitions, playing a regular role in the side's starting eleven. His most notable period in this first spell at Anderlecht was during the 2000–01 campaign, during which Anderlecht gained several high-profile victories over a host of big-name European clubs, such as Manchester United, Real Madrid and Lazio. In the 2–0 victory over Real, Goor got himself on the score-sheet.

Hertha BSC and Feyenoord
Goor's impressive and consistent form for Anderlecht was eventually rewarded by a transfer to Hertha BSC, where the Belgian would go on to spend three seasons. During this time he notched up a respectable number of performances for the German Bundesliga outfit, statistically improving his goal return in an average that saw 87 league appearances include a total of 13 goals.

He then transferred to Feyenoord, playing at the club as a regular in a time at the club that proved short-lived. After a falling-out with management staff, a decision was made for Goor to cut short his stay at the Eredivisie side.

Return to Anderlecht
A return to previous team Anderlecht proved the most tantalizing proposition for Goor following his Feyenoord troubles, and he signed back on for the side in the 2005–06 season. For a second time around Goor proved to be a hit for the Belgian side, featuring again as a regular in the squad and eventually becoming the club captain in 2006 following the retirement of Pär Zetterberg. He was captain of the Anderlecht side in the 2006–07 season. In the 2007–08 season, the captain's armband was handed over to the younger vice-captain Olivier Deschacht in times of Goor's absence through injury or national duty, with Deschacht ultimately becoming Anderlecht's official captain. He would go on to represent Anderlecht until midway through the 2008–09 campaign, having collected four Belgian First Division titles during his two stays at the Brussels club.

Post-Anderlecht
Having played his final game for Anderlecht on 18 December 2008, Goor completed a planned transfer to Germinal Beerschot in January 2009, where he played over two seasons. On 25 November 2011, news was released that Bart Goor and Beerschot had mutually agreed to terminate his contract, allowing Goor to sign for Westerlo who signed him to help avoid relegation. Westerlo was however unable to avoid relegation, but Goor remained with the team, completing the 2012–13 season in the Belgian Second Division. Goor then transferred to Dessel Sport in the same league, where he played the final season in his career.

International career

Euro 2000
Goor was part of the Belgium national football team at Euro 2000, which was co-hosted by Belgium and the Netherlands. Despite the team's victory in the opening game of tournament against Sweden, in which Goor scored the opening goal, the Belgians lost their second group match against Italy, and subsequently crashed out of the tournament in disappointing style in front of their own fans at the hands of Turkey in the first round.

Career statistics
Scores and results list Belgium's goal tally first, score column indicates score after each Goor goal.

Honours
Anderlecht
 Belgian First Division: 1999–2000, 2000–01, 2005–06, 2006–07
Belgian Cup: 2007–08
 Belgian Supercup: 2000, 2006, 2007
Belgian League Cup: 2000
Belgian Sports Team of the Year: 2000
Jules Pappaert Cup: 2000, 2001

Hertha Berlin
 DFL-Ligapokal: 2001, 2002

Belgium
 FIFA Fair Play Trophy: 2002 World Cup

Individual 

Goal of the Season: 2009-2010

References

External links
 
 

1973 births
Living people
Footballers from Limburg (Belgium)
People from Neerpelt
Belgian footballers
Association football wingers
K.R.C. Genk players
R.S.C. Anderlecht players
Beerschot A.C. players
K.V.C. Westerlo players
Hertha BSC players
Feyenoord players
K.F.C. Dessel Sport players
Belgian Pro League players
Challenger Pro League players
Bundesliga players
Eredivisie players
Belgium international footballers
UEFA Euro 2000 players
2002 FIFA World Cup players
Belgian expatriate footballers
Belgian expatriate sportspeople in Germany
Expatriate footballers in Germany